Adamoli is an Italian surname. Notable people with the surname include:

 Angela Adamoli (b. 1972), Italian basketball player
  (1894–1942), Italian aviator
  (1907–1978), Italian journalist
  (1840–1926), Italian engineer and politician
 Pierre Adamoli (1707–1769), French bibliophile
  (1878–1962), Italian politician

See also
 Adamoli-Cattani fighter

Italian-language surnames